In the physics inherited from Plato (although rejected by  Aristotle), an eye beam generated in the eye was thought to be responsible for the sense of sight. The eye beam darted by the imagined basilisk, for instance, was the agent of its lethal power, given the technical term extramission. 

The exaggerated eyes of fourth-century Roman emperors like Constantine the Great (illustration) reflect this character.<ref>L. Safran, "What Constantine saw: reflections on the Capitoline Colossus, visuality and early Christian studies" ''Millennium 3 (2006:43-73), noted in Paul Stephenson, Constantine, Roman Emperor, Christian Victor, 2010: notes 333.</ref> The concept found expression in poetry into the 17th century, most famously in John Donne's poem "The Extasie":
Our eye-beams twisted, and did thred
Our eyes, upon one double string;
So to'entergraft our hands, as yet
Was all the meanes to make us one,
And pictures in  our eyes to get
Was all our propagation.

In the same period John Milton wrote, of having gone blind, "When I consider how my light is spent", meaning that he had lost the capacity to generate eye beams.

Later in the century,  Newtonian optics and increased understanding of the structure of the eye rendered the old concept invalid, but it was revived as an aspect of monstrous superhuman capabilities in popular culture of the 20th century.

The emission theory of sight''' seemed to be corroborated by geometry and was reinforced by Robert Grosseteste.

In Algernon Swinburne's "Atalanta in Calydon" the conception is revived for  poetic  purposes, enriching the poem's pagan context in the Huntsman's invocation of Artemis:
Hear now and help, and lift no violent hand,
But favourable and fair as thine eye's beam,
Hidden and shown in heaven".

In T.S. Eliot's rose garden episode that introduces "Burnt Norton" eyebeams persist in the fusion of possible pasts and presents like unheard music:
The unheard music hidden in the shrubbery
And the unseen eyebeam crossed, for the roses
Had the look of flowers that are looked at.

The New Zealand poet Edward Tregear instanced "the lurid eye-beam of the angry Bull"— Taurus of the zodiac— among the familiar stars above the alien wilderness of New Zealand.

In computer graphics, the concept of eye beams is fruitfully resurrected in ray tracing (in which the bouncing of eye beams around a scene is simulated computationally).

See also
Emission theory (vision)

Notes

Obsolete theories in physics
Vision